The Frisian National Party (FNP) is a Frisian nationalist political party in the Netherlands. The FNP is mostly involved in Frisian politics. The Independent Senate Group represents the FNP on a national level, the EFA represents the FNP on a European level.

Party history
The party was founded in 1962 by young activists of the Frisian movement, which developed in the 19th century. It advocated the importance of the (West) Frisian language, culture and sports. The movement was founded in reaction to the use of Dutch in sermons of Dutch Reformed Churches in Friesland. The Frisian movement has links with the reformed Anti-Revolutionary Party, but in the 1962 provincial elections it claimed that Frisian interests were less important than Dutch national interests.

In 1966, it won its first seat in the provincial legislature and municipal councils. In 1995, it cooperated with provincial parties and the Greens to get a seat in the Senate, which is elected indirectly, in the so-called Independent Senate Group. Between 1995 and 2003, it was taken by a member of the Greens, since 2003 it is taken by a member of the FNP.

Ideology and issues
The FNP is a nationalist party which advocates a federal political system in which Frisians get more autonomy or independence. It calls for greater autonomy of the region, government use, protection and recognition of the Frisian language and Frisian control over its gas reserves.

According to a survey of 554 party members done by the European Policies Research Centre at the University of Strathclyde in 2009, 5.05% of members identified as far-left on the political spectrum, 13.9% as left-wing, 28.16% as centre-left, 17.51% as centrist, 14.98% as centre-right, 7.4% as right-wing, and 2.53% as far-right, with 10.47% unsure.

Representation
Since 1995 the party cooperated with several provincial parties and the Greens in the Independent Senate Fraction which had one seat in the Senate. From 2003 till 2011 and 2015 till 2019 this seat was taken by Hendrik ten Hoeve, a member of the FNP. In 2019 the seat was taken by Gerben Gerbrandy also a member of the FNP.

The party has four (out of 43) seats in the Frisian provincial legislative and is part of the provincial government since 2011.

The party has 39 members in 11 of the 18 Frisian municipal councils. It cooperates in the local executive of Tytsjerksteradiel, Waadhoeke, and Noardeast-Fryslân. In Wûnseradiel and Achtkarspelen the party supplied the mayor. In 2020 the party supplies the Mayor in Noardeast-Fryslân.

On the European level, the party is a member of the European Free Alliance, although it has no seats in the European Parliament.

Electoral performance
The party's electorate is limited to Friesland, where it dominates in the Western and North-Eastern part of the mainland of the province. In rural Littenseradiel, the FNP got nearly 28% of the votes and became the largest party in 2003.

In 2010 33.9% of the people voted FNP in rural Skarsterlân.

Relationships with other parties
The party has good relations with other provincial parties like Party New Limburg with which it together forms the Independent Senate Group. Historically it cooperated very well with the Political Party of Radicals, a left-wing Christian party.

References

External links
  

Regionalist parties in the Netherlands
Political parties established in 1962
Politics of Friesland
European Free Alliance
1962 establishments in the Netherlands